Reinersville is an unincorporated community in Morgan County, in the U.S. state of Ohio.

History
Reinersville was laid out in 1848 by Samuel Reiner, and named for him. A post office was established at Reinersville in 1854, and remained in operation until 1978.

References

Unincorporated communities in Morgan County, Ohio
Unincorporated communities in Ohio
1848 establishments in Ohio